Devika Bandana is a Nepalese solo and playback singer. She has received national level awards including Gorkha Dakshin Bahu and Chinnalata Geet Purashkar. She also participated the song Melancholy, a song by 365 Nepali Artists which was recorded in a single day on 19 May 2016, in Radio Nepal, Kathmandu in which song was attempt to break the Guinness World Records, has been written, music composed and directed by environmentalist Nipesh Dhaka.

Awards

Appearances on television
 As a Judge on Hero Honda Voice of Teen Season 1 (2006)

References

21st-century Nepalese women singers
Nepalese playback singers
Year of birth missing (living people)
Living people
People from Ilam District